Ababkovo is a rural locality (a selo) in Dmitriyevskoye Rural Settlement Galichsky District, Russia. The population was 7 as of 2014.

Streets 
There are no streets with titles.

Geography 
Ababkovo is located 10 km west of Galich (the district's administrative centre) by road. Shabalino is the nearest rural locality.

References 

Rural localities in Kostroma Oblast
Galichsky District